Blair Kurtz  (1963−2017) was an Australian former professional rugby league footballer who played in the 1980s. He played for Parramatta in the NSWRL competition.

Early career
Kurtz was raised in Toongabbie, New South Wales and was a local Parramatta junior who worked his way through the junior representative squads to Parramatta's senior grades.

Playing career
Kurtz made his first grade debut in round 5 of the 1984 NSWRL season against Western Suburbs at Lidcombe Oval. Kurtz made two further appearances for Parramatta in the top grade.

Post playing
Post his footballing career, Kurtz had a career as veterinarian both in the greyhound industry and as co-owner of the  Quakers Hill Veterinary Hospital. In July 2015, while training for a half marathon, he was diagnosed with an aggressive form of Motor Neurone Disease and died in 2017.

References

Parramatta Eels players
Australian rugby league players
1963 births
2017 deaths